Sonar is the name of three fictional characters appearing in American comic books published by DC Comics.

Publication history
The Bito Wladon version of Sonar first appears in Green Lantern (vol. 2) #14 and is created by John Broome and Gil Kane.

Fictional character biography

Bito Wladon

The small Balkan nation of Modora was sealed off from the rest of the world by Fando the Mad, a leader who believed Modora should be frozen in its past, and cut off access to the outside world while making all decisions for his countrymen. One man, Bito Wladon, is determined to change that.

Wladon's parents are deaf, which is a mark of Satan to the superstitious Modorans. According to Modoran beliefs, they are not to be hurt or killed, but shunned. Although Wladon can hear, he is branded a pariah as well. Wladon hides from the rest of the world in a barn, and he discovers a cache of books hidden by his peddler grandfather against Fando's orders.

Bito Wladon becomes a clockmaker's apprentice while he secretly works on mastering sound. He invents the "nucleo-sonic motor", which can use any sound source to power it. Wladon discovers he can nullify gravity or concentrate sound as a destructive force. Believing the greatest nations on Earth were also the most powerful, Wladon supplies Modora with the "nucleo-sonic bomb", a weapon based on supersonic energy to make it the most powerful country in the world.

However, his homeland is not technologically advanced enough to support his efforts. Wladon slips out of Modora for the United States. Many of the items he needs are classified equipment, and he commits crimes to acquire the components needed.

Wladon designs a regal military costume befitting of the future of Modora. When he appears in the United States, the media dubs him Sonar because of his mastery of sound.

After returning home from a cosmos-wide meeting of the Green Lantern Corps, Green Lantern of Earth Hal Jordan visits Modora to get a stamp for Tom Kalmaku's stamp collection. While he was searching for a stamp, Jordan learns of Wladon and his sound discoveries from the clockmaker, and he returns to the United States as soon as possible.

Sonar defeats Green Lantern, but despite his victory, he is disturbed by Modora's lack of representation in the media. He needs one more robbery to gain the components to his nucleo-sonic bomb. Sonar prepares for his next skirmish with Green Lantern by creating a tuning fork gun.

Sonar's tuning fork gun makes Green Lantern see everything in yellow.

Sonar travels east, crossing the Atlantic Ocean on his way to Modora. His tuning fork gun leaves a faint trail of radiation Jordan can track, whose ring creates a waterspout to defeat Sonar.

Although he is stripped of his weapons and stolen technology before being imprisoned, Sonar is proud his exploits had made the newspapers all over the world. The people of Modora show their gratitude to Green Lantern by creating a Modoran postage stamp for the hero, which he gives to Kalmaku to complete his stamp collection.

Fando knows Sonar is a threat to his power, but Wladon appeals to his greed and fear. Fando later believes Sonar would help him keep his power. Weeks later, Sonar is released from prison by a legal loophole: using an old Modoran law, Sonar is granted his freedom due to his help in the annual harvest.

Playing upon Fando's insecurities, Wladon strikes a deal with him and becomes commander of his armies. However, Wladon secretly orchestrates an invasion by one of Modora's neighbours and murders Fando and the royal family during the confusion, and becomes the new ruler of Modora.

When Jordan goes to the Slab to get information from Hector Hammond, he is taunted by Wladon, who claims that he should not be locked up because he had diplomatic immunity, until Jordan knocks him out with a power ring-generated fist.

In the following years, Sonar continues his adversarial relationship with Jordan while slowly expanding his influence across Europe. Incarcerated by the Justice League after his failed take-over of the former Soviet Union, Wladon's sound technology and name are adopted by a mentally unstable criminal, who has the devices implanted beneath his skin.

Sonar reappears in 52 as the Modoran representative to Black Adam's Freedom of Power coalition.

In 2011, The New 52 rebooted the DC universe. Sonar and his Modorans first appear when they are carrying unknown weapons and heading to Coast City. The Modorans successfully plant a bomb in Coast City's carnival, where Jordan saves a Ferris wheel from falling. Sonar sends a broadcast message to Modora, say that he will terrorize with more bombs with his sound. Jordan pursues Sonar to Kahndaq, where the former captures Modoran soldiers, demanding they tell him where Sonar is. The Modoran soldiers kill themselves with bombs implanted in their necks to avoid being caught. In an unknown lair, Sonar watches the news of the United Nations General Assembly. He secretly plants a bomb device made of hearing aids, waiting to trigger the sound bomb at the ambassador debate, but his plan fails when Jordan prevents the debate, removes all the hearing aids and shields the ambassadors from the explosion radius. Sonar is furious and vows that Modora will be rebuilt.

In the "Watchmen" sequel "Doomsday Clock", Sonar is among the villains that attend the underground meeting held by the Riddler. He mentions that most of Green Lantern's alien enemies are currently off-world.

Second Sonar
For a brief time, a second Sonar appears and fights the Doom Patrol. He has made only one appearance so far and nothing has been revealed about his background or powers.

Third Sonar

Following in the footsteps of the original Sonar who was his father, the new Sonar gains his predecessor's powers to create an empire. Although the source of his powers remains unrevealed, he states that it involved suffering through agonizing experiments. Sonar alludes to his father being a monarch, but the original Sonar did not mention fathering an heir. His name is revealed to be Bito Wladon Jr.

The new Sonar first appears in Keystone City to test his new powers. Sonar tears up the Keystone City Hall. He fights Flash. The battle is brief, with Sonar fleeing from Keystone for a larger city to rule. Sonar plans to conquer a kingdom worthy of his royal stature. Sonar arrives in New York City and uses the sounds of Manhattan against Kyle Rayner. West joins the fight after tracking Wladon Jr. to the Big Apple. Sonar is defeated when the Flash causes him to accelerate faster than sound. Rayner takes Sonar to the Slabside Island Maximum Security Prison.

Through unknown means, Sonar escapes his cell and turns his powers upon himself. He cybernetically enhances himself and radically alters his appearance. After taking five guards as hostages, he frees the rest of the prisoners.

Rayner learns of the uprising and returns to the Slab as Green Lantern. Sonar gathers the prisoners as a small army. Sonar speaks of making New York City his empire. Though he was a force to be reckoned with, he does not impress Sledge, another prisoner in the Slab.

Sledge joins forces with Rayner to take down their mutual enemy, but does not reveal his plan. Sledge separates from Rayner as the latter fights the freed villains. He is rescued by Sledge, who pounds Sonar through the floor of the prison, opening a hole to the ocean.

Rayner searches for Sonar but eventually gives up, believing his foe was dead at the hands of Sledge. Sonar's body is not found.

Sonar survives and returns to battle Rayner in the middle of New York City. The effects of the so-called "Godwave" during the Genesis incident causes Rayner's power ring to temporarily lose all of its energy, but Sonar is still defeated.

During the Ion saga, Rayner watches Sonar and Jade fight.

Sonar is later featured in JLA-80 Page Giant #1, discussing many supervillains with the Rainbow Raider.

Sonar has been seen among the new Injustice League, and is one of the villains featured in Salvation Run. He is one of the villains sent to retrieve the Get Out of Hell Free card from the Secret Six.

Powers and abilities
Wladon carries a Sonic Sceptre, a device that enables him to absorb sound, which he can also use to fly, project illusions, fire sonic attacks and perform telekinetic feats.

Wladon Jr. is cybernetically enhanced to harness ambient sound and use for his own purposes. He usually attacks by firing sonic blasts.

Other versions

Anti-matter universe
Sonar has a counterpart in the anti-matter universe of the Crime Syndicate of America named Lady Sonar, who is a member of the Justice Underground.

Sonarr
A Scottish superhero with a bagpipe named Sonarr is introduced in Justice League Quarterly #8.

JLA/Avengers
Sonar appears in JLA/Avengers #3 as the leader of a group of villains under the villain Krona's control. Sonar helps the Silver Swan and the Silver Banshee defeat the Vision with sonics and magic, but he is disarmed by Captain America. He is entrapped by Wonder Woman's magic lasso and unwittingly spills the truth about Krona, though he calls him "the Master".

Flashpoint
In Flashpoint, Sonar is a member of Deathstroke's pirates. After being broken out of a floating prison by Deathstroke, Clayface tells Deathstroke about how Sonar could use his abilities to detect sunken treasures. He is not in the prison due to a superhuman trade, but Deathstroke catches up with him. He is imprisoned in Deathstroke's ship and used as a living radar system. After an attack by Aquaman and the Ocean Master, Sonar asks the Icicle to free him and strikes a deal with Deathstroke to treat his wounds in return for being made second-in-command. Using his sonic abilities, Sonar removes a piece of Aquaman's trident from Deathstroke's chest. After the Warlord's ships are destroyed by Jenny Blitz, Sonar participates in a mutiny against Deathstroke, but Deathstroke and Blitz kill the crew members for their treachery. Sonar manages to contact another pirate fleet led by the Caretaker before Deathstroke shoots him.

Elseworlds
A version of Sonar appears in the Elseworlds story JLA: Act of God. This version of Sonar has cybernetic augmentations and a fixation on Rayner. One year after the mysterious disappearance of all superpowers in the event called Black Light, Sonar and Rayner have a final showdown, which ends with Rayner impaled.

In other media
 The Bito Wladon incarnation of Sonar appears in Justice League Unlimited, voiced by an uncredited Corey Burton. This version is a member of Gorilla Grodd's Secret Society. Following a minor appearance in the episode "I Am Legion", Sonar assists Roulette in her "Meta-Brawl: Glamour Slam" in the episode "Grudge Match" until he is defeated by Black Canary and the Huntress and arrested by the police.
 The Flashpoint incarnation of Bito Wladon / Sonar appears in Justice League: The Flashpoint Paradox.

References

External links
 Atlas of the DC Universe
 DCU Guide: Sonar
 DCU Guide: Sonar II
 DCU Guide: The Book of OA
 DCU Guide: Sonarr

Comics characters introduced in 1962
Fictional kings
DC Comics supervillains
Characters created by John Broome
Characters created by Gil Kane
DC Comics metahumans